Qarah Yataq (also Romanized as Qarah Yātāq) is a village in Ani Rural District, in the Central District of Germi County, Ardabil Province, Iran. At the 2006 census, its population was 136, in 27 families.

The village is one of the most beautiful tourist areas in Iran. gare Ytaq village is located in the northwest of the country, the West Sea, northeast Azerbaijan, Ardabil, north and southeast of the warmth of the Magi, Ojarud-e Sharqi Rural District in the central city of the Magi, the 48-degree V8 minutes east of the meridian V39 degrees latitude north of the equator and 1 minute of origin.
Overview of the village

The village is connected to the north by  Darmanlu and Shlveh village lands, from  East  to Shelve village  land  and from the south to the land of  Alilah village . the West Lesser  to village Shavyn.
The average height of the Seas 1500 (thousand) meters. Its distance from the city Germi (Magi) about 12kilometr  and Ardabil 120 km
The village consists of 22 households and a population of about 200
The village is beautiful and pristine nature that It displays his four seasons with all its beauty
Soaring mountains and forests scatter is located on the south  of side, such as the mountain, including the Civil Salman .

In the Qara Dagh spas are located which many man and women come from all over the city to use. Its water has a rapid effect in the treatment of kidney stones and other diseases.

References 

Towns and villages in Germi County